Dalayer-e Olya (also Romanized as Dalāyer-e ‘Olyā; also known as Dalāyer-e Bālā and Dūlāir) is a village in Karasf Rural District, in the Central District of Khodabandeh County, Zanjan Province, Iran. At the 2006 census, its population was 283, in 63 families.

References 

Populated places in Khodabandeh County